National Fishing Enhancement Act of 1984 is a federal statute delineating codification for the construction, habitat settings, and monitoring of artificial reefs in the United States maritime boundary. The Act of Congress declares degradation of fishery habitats and overfishing have created a declivity in the shoaling and schooling yields of United States saltwater fish resources. The Act asserts artificial reefs have potential for economic relief concerning the United States coastal economies where aquaculture operations have soaring energy costs adversely burdening their expenditures for the commercial fishing and recreational fishing conservation practices.

The United States House of Representatives bill 5447 was superseded by the U.S. House bill 6342 supporting the governance of the international fishery agreements with Iceland and the European Economic Community. The United States marine conservation decree endorses the Convention for the Conservation of Antarctic Marine Living Resources as an international relations agreement encompassing the Antarctic Treaty System. The United States international fishery agreements foster the regulations and rulings of the Magnuson–Stevens Fishery Conservation and Management Act enacted into law in 1976.  The H.R. 6342 title provides a declaration of;

The H.R. 6342 legislation, superseding the H.R. 5447 bill, was approved by the 98th United States Congress and enacted into law by the 40th president of the United States Ronald Reagan on November 8, 1984.

Declaration of the Act
The offshore maritime management legislation was authored as a regulatory title as part of the Fishery Conservation and Management Act of 1984. The Act was drafted as eight sections chartering a national artificial reef plan for the offshore aquaculture regions of the United States.

Title II - Artificial Reefs

U.S. Maritime Programs Act of 1972
On February 23, 1972, the 92nd United States Congress introduced U.S. House bill H.R. 13324 supporting United States Department of Commerce maritime programs and federal appropriations for the fiscal year 1973. The United States maritime programs appropriations provided an authorization for the submersion of Liberty ships establishing offshore artificial reefs to sustain marine life. The appropriations bill was enacted into law by the 37th president of the United States Richard Nixon on August 22, 1972.

See also
Artificial reefs in Japan
Coral reefs of the Virgin Islands
Marine ecosystem
Submerged Lands Act of 1953

References

U.S. States Artificial Reefs Programs

External links
 
 
 
 

1984 in law
1984 in American law
1984 in the environment
1984 in international relations
98th United States Congress
Fish conservation
Fisheries law
United States federal environmental legislation